Tottenham railway station is located on the Sunbury line in Victoria, Australia. It serves the western Melbourne suburb of West Footscray, and it opened on 2 March 1891.

The station is located above the Ashley Street rail overpass, which provides station access. Tottenham Yard lies north of the station. A number of freight only lines also operate alongside, along with the Melbourne – Sydney and Melbourne – Adelaide standard gauge lines. The Regional Rail Link lines operates to the south of the station.

History

Tottenham station opened on 2 March 1891 and, like the suburb itself, was named after Tottenham in Middlesex, England.

During 1981–1982, the station was rebuilt as an island platform, to eliminate the Ashley Street level crossing, replacing it with a rail overpass over a two-lane road tunnel. The Up line first opened on 19 May 1981, and the Down line and island platform opened later, on 27 July 1982. At the same time, the signal box was demolished, and a number of signal posts and a crossover were abolished.

In 2014, a minor upgrade was undertaken to the station as part of the Regional Rail Link project. The biggest of these was the extension of the bridge over Ashley Street to accommodate the new tracks. The façade facing Sunshine Road was also upgraded, as well as a new car park and 'Park and Ride' facilities added, and a power substation built on Sunshine Road, just beyond the car park.

Demolished station White City was located between Tottenham and Sunshine. On 4 October 1981, the station was closed to all traffic.

Platforms and services

Tottenham has one island platform with two faces. It is serviced by Metro Trains' Sunbury line services. Express services do not stop at Tottenham.

Platform 1:
  all stations services to Flinders Street

Platform 2:
  all stations services to Watergardens and Sunbury

By late 2025, it is planned that trains on the Sunbury line will be through-routed with those on the Pakenham and Cranbourne lines, via the new Metro Tunnel.

See also 
 Tottenham Hale station

References

External links
 
 Rail Geelong gallery
 Melway map at street-directory.com.au

Railway stations in Melbourne
Railway stations in Australia opened in 1891
Railway stations in the City of Maribyrnong